Warren Zimmermann (November 16, 1934 – February 3, 2004) was an American career diplomat best known as the last US ambassador to SFR Yugoslavia before its disintegration in a series of civil wars. Zimmermann was a member of the Yale Class of 1956, and a member of Scroll and Key Society. He died of pancreatic cancer at his home in Great Falls, Virginia on February 3, 2004.

Career
Warren Zimmermann served in Moscow (1973–75 and 1981–84), Paris, Caracas and Vienna, where he headed the US delegation at the Conference on Security and Cooperation in Europe (1986–89). But it was Yugoslavia that marked him more than any other phase in his professional life, and brought him to prominence.

Bosnian War
Zimmermann played an active diplomatic and geopolitical role during the initial stages of the Bosnian War.

According to Robert W. Tucker, Professor Emeritus of American Foreign Policy at Johns Hopkins University and David C. Hendrickson, a Professor at Colorado College, Zimmermann may have scuttled the Lisbon Agreement also known as Carrington-Cutileiro peace plan. That was an agreement that would have made peace between three main ethnicities, Bosniaks, Serbs, and Croats, living within the bounds of Bosnia and Herzegovina by the creation of a cantons system, such as exist in Switzerland. At a time when Bosnia-Herzegovina was sliding into war along ethnic lines, this plan proposed ethnic power-sharing on all administrative levels and the devolution of central government to local ethnic communities. On 28 March 1992, ten days after the agreement had been signed by each of the three sides, Zimmermann came to Sarajevo to meet with Alija Izetbegović, president of the Presidency of Bosnia and Herzegovina, giving Izetbegović assurances of U.S. support for a full independent nation without internal division.

Within days of meeting Zimmermann, Izetbegović withdrew his signature and renounced the peace plan he agreed to in Lisbon, suddenly declaring his opposition to any type of ethnic division of Bosnia and Herzegovina. Within weeks a full blown war developed. Three and a half years later, the Dayton Accord that all three sides accepted in November 1995 thus ending the war, featured a very similar canton system, dividing Bosnia-Herzegovina internally along ethnic lines. Writing in 1997, Alfred Sherman, British political analyst and an adviser to Margaret Thatcher, described Zimmermann's involvement in Bosnia, along with American overall foreign policy in the Balkans, as: "lying and cheating, fomenting war in which civilians are the main casualty, and in which ancient hatreds feed on themselves".

As the Bosnian conflict developed into a full war during spring 1992, Zimmermann supported the policy of foreign military interventionism.

According to journalist Samantha Power, the author of A Problem from Hell: America and the Age of Genocide, Zimmermann’s career in Yugoslavia was marked by "frustration with the resistance of the Bush administration to intervene". His last official act before he was recalled to the United States on 16 May 1992, was to write a confidential memo called "Who Killed Yugoslavia?" to the secretary of state. Each of the five sections of the memo was headed by a verse from the poem "Who Killed Cock Robin?". In Zimmermann's analysis, the nationalism of the Balkan leaders had led to the demise of the country.

Zimmermann resigned from the diplomatic service in 1994 in protest at President Bill Clinton's reluctance to intervene in the Bosnian War. He campaigned to persuade the U.S. that it must act to end what he reportedly saw to be "Serbian aggression in the killing fields of Bosnia" and was of the opinion that "NATO air strikes against the Serbs at any point during the war would have stopped the war and brought a negotiated agreement".

Zimmermann went on to teach at Johns Hopkins University (1994–96) and Columbia University (1996–2000), and spoke out against human rights violations.

Zimmermann wrote an account of his experiences in Yugoslavia, The Origins Of A Catastrophe (1996). According to what he wrote in the book, Franjo Tuđman claimed that Bosnia should be divided between the Croats and the Serbs in the Milošević–Tuđman Karađorđevo meeting. "Tuđman admitted that he discussed these fantasies with Milošević, the Yugoslav Army leadership and the Bosnian Serbs," writes Zimmerman, "and they agreed that the only solution is to divide up Bosnia between Serbia and Croatia".

Works
 
Following his ambassadorship in Yugoslavia, Zimmermann authored two books: Origins of a Catastrophe: Yugoslavia and Its Destroyers — America's Last Ambassador Tells What Happened and Why, published in 1996, and First Great Triumph: How Five Americans Made Their Country a World Power, a work about Theodore Roosevelt, Henry Cabot Lodge, John Hay, Elihu Root, and Admiral Alfred T. Mahan, published in 2002.

Bibliography
First Great Triumph: How Five Americans Made Their Country a World Power (Farrar, Straus and Giroux, 2004).

References

External links

1934 births
2004 deaths
Deerfield Academy alumni
Yale University alumni
Ambassadors of the United States to Yugoslavia
20th-century American diplomats
Deaths from cancer in Virginia
Deaths from pancreatic cancer